RBD: La Familia (English: RBD: The Family) is the first soundtrack album by Mexican pop band RBD. The soundtrack was made to promote the group's 2007 sitcom RBD: La Familia. It was released exclusively by the Mexican television network SKY on March 14, 2007. The compilation included the newly recorded track "Quiero Poder," which was co-written by RBD band member Dulce María and Gonzalo Schroeder, two acoustic songs, one live track and 6 songs from the group's previous albums. The DVD-side of the soundtrack also included a behind-the-scenes documentary of the recording of "Quiero Poder."

Track listing

Notes

RBD albums
2007 compilation albums